2004 in television may refer to:
2004 in American television
2004 in Australian television
2004 in Belgian television
2004 in Brazilian television
2004 in British television
2004 in Canadian television
2004 in Croatian television
2004 in Danish television
2004 in Dutch television
2004 in Estonian television
2004 in French television
2004 in German television
2004 in Irish television
2004 in Italian television
2004 in Japanese television
2004 in Mexican television
2004 in New Zealand television
2004 in Norwegian television
2004 in Philippine television
2004 in Polish television
2004 in Portuguese television
2004 in Scottish television
2004 in Spanish television
2004 in Swedish television
2004 in Turkish television